Castle Hot Springs is a recently restored historic resort in Arizona that is listed on the National Register of Historic Places. It is located within the Hieroglyphic Mountains.

History
The Apache Wars discouraged development of the area until the 1880s when the springs and the adjacent land were purchased by Frank Murphy for the construction of a health resort.  The resort was completed in 1896 by the brother of the Arizona Governor Oakes Murphy, and the newly renamed "Castle Hot Springs" was heavily advertised to potential clients.  During the resort's heyday in the 1920s it was visited by celebrities such as Zane Grey, as well as famous families such as the Rockefellers.

The resort was used by the United States military as a rehabilitation center from 1943 to 1944 to treat injured veterans of World War II.  Future president John F. Kennedy spent three months at the resort during this period to recover from his wounds suffered during the sinking of his ship, PT-109.

The resort continued to be commercially operated until the main building was heavily damaged in a fire in 1976. The resort still comprises its swimming pool, administrative building and guest house along with the springs, which produce 180,000 gallons of hot water a day. The resort became a stop on the short-line Arizona and California Railroad in the 1990s.

The property was sold in March 2014 for $1.95 million.   In March 2018, the resort announced a restoration was underway with plans for reopening in October of that year. The new owners have extensively remodeled and added to the property, adding 12 spring bungalows - with hot spring fed tubs, and 17 sky-view cabins. The resort reopened to visitors in February 2019.

In media
Castle Hot Springs Resort was the subject of a 1994 documentary film by Mike Smith and a fellow student.

See also

 Sasco, Arizona
 Treasures from American Film Archives: Treasures 5: The West, 1898–1938 (2011) (disc 3)
 Santa Monica Army Air Forces Redistribution Center

References

Further reading

External links
 Castle Hot Springs – ghosttowns.com
 Castle Hot Springs – Jewel of the Bradshaws! (December 31, 2011), from SonoranTreeSvc.com
 Castle Hot Springs, at DailyJFK.com
 Castle Hot Springs Resort New Castle Hot Springs website for rebuilt resort

Commercial buildings on the National Register of Historic Places in Arizona
Hot springs of Arizona
Ghost towns in Arizona
Bodies of water of Yavapai County, Arizona
National Register of Historic Places in Yavapai County, Arizona